Berg Peak is a prominent peak,  high, standing  south of El Pulgar in the northern Morozumi Range, Victoria Land, Antarctica. It was mapped by the United States Geological Survey from surveys and from U.S. Navy air photos, 1960–63, and named by the Advisory Committee on Antarctic Names for Thomas E. Berg, a geologist who wintered at McMurdo Sound in 1961, and spent three succeeding summer seasons making patterned ground studies in the area. Berg perished in the crash of a U.S. Navy helicopter near Mount McLennan, November 19, 1969. The peak lies situated on the Pennell Coast, a portion of Antarctica lying between Cape Williams and Cape Adare.

See also 
Mount Twomey

References 

Mountains of Victoria Land
Pennell Coast
One-thousanders of Antarctica